Julio Blanc (born 6 July 1995) is a Chilean rugby union player, currently playing for Súper Liga Americana de Rugby side Selknam. His preferred position is wing.

Professional career
Blanc signed for Súper Liga Americana de Rugby side Selknam ahead of the 2020 Súper Liga Americana de Rugby season, and re-signed ahead of the 2021 Súper Liga Americana de Rugby season. He had previously played for both the Chile national side and the Chile Sevens side. He competed for the Chile at the 2022 Rugby World Cup Sevens in Cape Town.

References

External links

1995 births
Living people
Chilean rugby union players
Rugby union wings
Selknam (rugby union) players
Chile international rugby union players